The 2013–14 President's Trophy was one of two first-class cricket competitions that were held in Pakistan during the 2013–14 season, the other being the Quaid-e-Azam Trophy. It was the second edition of the President's Trophy.

It was contested by eleven departmental teams, one more than the previous season with the addition of Pakistan Television who had won the previous season's Patron's Trophy Grade-II competition. Each team played ten 4-day matches in a round-robin league phase between 23 October 2013 and 22 January 2014, with the top two teams contesting the final on 12–15 March 2014.

Sui Northern Gas Pipelines Limited defended the title, winning six of their nine group matches and beating United Bank Limited, who had topped the group stage having finished in last place the previous season, in the final.

Group stage

Points Table

Source:

The order in the table is determined by total points, followed by number of matches won, then fewest matches lost.

Final

Notes

References

External links
 President's Trophy 2013–14 at the PCB official website
 President's Trophy 2013–14 at ESPN Cricinfo

2013–14 President's Trophy
2013 in Pakistani cricket
2014 in Pakistani cricket
Domestic cricket competitions in 2013–14